Gerard Theodor Hubert van Innis (24 February 1866 – 25 November 1961) was a Belgian competitor in the sport of archery, he competed in two Summer Olympics 20 years apart and came away with six gold medals and three silver medals.

As a young boy the story goes he was forced to work as a milk delivery boy in the villages around Brussels, and at the end of his deliveries he would send his dog and cart home while he went off to practice his archery skills.

When he was 13 years old he won the first prize in a main competition Antwerp. He also won the prize in 1893, 1894, 1895 and 1896. In 1881 he won the royan prize of Roozendaal.

Van Innis was 34 years old when he competed at the 1900 Summer Olympics held in Paris, France, he entered four events, he won gold medals in the Au Cordon Doré 33 metres and the Au Chapelet 33 metres events, he also came second behind Frenchman Henri Hérouin in the Au Cordon Doré 50 metres, his worst result of the Games was a fourth place in the Au Chapelet 50 metres.

Van Innis had to wait another twenty years before competing on the Olympic stage, he then entered the 1920 Summer Olympics held on his home soil in Antwerp, Belgium, where he added to his medal tally with two more individual gold medals in the Individual moving bird, 28 metres beating Frenchman Léonce Quentin as only two people competed and the Individual moving bird, 33 metres, he then lost to Frenchman Julien Brulé in the Individual moving bird, 50 metres to win a silver medal, he also added three team medals with two more golds in the Team moving bird, 50 metres, Team moving bird, 33 metres and a silver medal in the Team moving bird, 28 metres, his final Olympic medal tally was six gold medals and three silver medals.

Unbelievably when aged 67 years old and 13 years after his Olympic victories he went on to win in the 1933 World Championships.

His legacy has continued through his family, his great-grandson Philippe Prieels has competed in the World Archery Championships and his great great granddaughter Sarah Prieels has also competed in the World Archery Championships.

See also
 Archery at the 1900 Summer Olympics
 List of multiple Olympic gold medalists at a single Games
 List of multiple Summer Olympic medalists

References

External links

 

1866 births
1961 deaths
Archers at the 1900 Summer Olympics
Archers at the 1920 Summer Olympics
Olympic archers of Belgium
Olympic gold medalists for Belgium
Olympic silver medalists for Belgium
Belgian male archers
Olympic medalists in archery
Medalists at the 1920 Summer Olympics
Medalists at the 1900 Summer Olympics
People from Zemst
Sportspeople from Flemish Brabant